Nagdih is a village in the Sheikhpura district of Bihar, India.

Etymology of the name 

The name Nagdih is derived from the words ‘‘NAG" and "Dih" meaning "The house of Snake". The phrase was used that the inhabitants of this village were very strong and brave. The village was inhabited in medieval times.

History

The majority of the village's inhabitants have been a part of the Kurmi community since the 18th Century. Following the decline of Mughal rule in the early 18th Century, the Indian subcontinent's hinterland dwellers, many of whom were armed and nomadic, began to appear more frequently in settled areas and interact with townspeople and agriculturists. The Kurmi were famous for being cultivators and market gardeners. The main reason for this was the significant productivity of the Kurmi, whose success lay in superior use of manure, according to historian Christopher Bayly.

Geography and climate

Nagdih is located on highly fertile flat land. It is drained by the canal and Motor-Pumps.

The winter months are December and January. April to mid June are the hottest months. The monsoon months of June, July, August, and September see heavy rainfall. October and November and February and March have a pleasant climate.

Population
Nagdih consists of 210 households and has a population of 2176.

Education
There is a primary school, Nagdih Primary School, in the village.

Villages in Sheikhpura district